The 2010–11 UCF Knights men's basketball team was an NCAA Division I college basketball team that represented the University of Central Florida and competed in Conference USA. They played their home games at UCF Arena in Orlando, Florida and were led by first year head coach Donnie Jones.

Following a 10–0 start to the season, in which they defeated #18 Florida, South Florida, and Miami, the Knights were nationally ranked for the first time in program history. At the time, UCF was one of only four schools to be ranked in the BCS standings and the AP men's basketball poll.

They finished the season 21–12, 6–10 in CUSA play and lost in the first round of the 2011 Conference USA men's basketball tournament to East Carolina. They were invited to the 2011 College Basketball Invitational where they beat St. Bonaventure in the first round and Rhode Island in the quarterfinals before falling to Creighton in the semifinals.

In February 2012, UCF vacated its wins from the 2010–11 season after it was discovered that there was an ineligible player on the team.

Previous season
In the previous year, the Knights finished the season 15–17, 6–10 in C-USA play under the leadership of Head Coach Kirk Speraw. After the season, Speraw was fired and replaced by Donnie Jones .

Roster

Coaches

Schedule and results

|-
!colspan=8 style=|Exhibition

|-
!colspan=8 style=|Regular Season
|-

|-
!colspan=8 style=| Conference USA Tournament
|-

|-
!colspan=8 style=| College Basketball Invitational

|-
| colspan="8" | *Non-Conference Game. Rankings from AP poll. All times are in Eastern Time.**The game on February 2 at UTEP was canceled due to inclement weather and rescheduled for February 21.
|}

Rankings

References

UCF Knights men's basketball seasons
UCF
UCF
UCF Knights
UCF Knights